ISO 3166-2:PS is the entry for the State of Palestine in ISO 3166-2, part of the ISO 3166 standard published by the International Organization for Standardization (ISO), which defines codes for the names of the principal subdivisions (e.g., provinces or states) of all countries coded in ISO 3166-1.

Currently for the State of Palestine, it claims the West Bank and the Gaza Strip, but in fact controls only about 40% of the West Bank. ISO 3166-2 codes are defined for 16 governorates.

Each code consists of two parts, separated by a hyphen. The second part is three letters.

Current codes
Subdivision names are listed as in the ISO 3166-2 standard published by the ISO 3166 Maintenance Agency (ISO 3166/MA).

ISO 639-1 codes are used to represent subdivision names in the following administrative languages:
 (ar): Arabic
 (en): English

Governorates

Click on the button in the header to sort each column.

Changes
The following changes to the entry have been announced by the ISO 3166/MA since the first publication of ISO 3166-2 in 1998.  ISO stopped issuing newsletters in 2013.

See also
 Subdivisions of the State of Palestine

References

External links
 ISO Online Browsing Platform: PS

2:PS
ISO 3166-2
State of Palestine geography-related lists
State of Palestine